Thatcherina is a genus of sea snails, marine gastropod mollusks in the family Raphitomidae.

Species
Species within the genus Thatcherina include:

 Thatcherina diazi Gracia & Vera-Peláez, 2004

References

Monotypic gastropod genera
Raphitomidae